(Cyclopentadienyl)titanium trichloride is an organotitanium compound with the formula (CH)TiCl.  It is a moisture sensitive orange solid.  The compound adopts a piano stool geometry.

Preparation and reactions
(CH)TiCl is prepared by the reaction of titanocene dichloride and titanium tetrachloride:
(CH)TiCl  +  TiCl  →   2 (CH)TiCl
The complex is electrophilic, readily forming alkoxide complexes upon treatment with alcohols.

Reduction of (cyclopentadienyl)titanium trichloride with zinc powder gives the polymeric Ti(III) derivative (cyclopentadienyl)titanium dichloride:
(CH)TiCl  +  0.5Zn  →   1/n[(CH)TiCl]  +  0.5ZnCl

See also
 (Cyclopentadienyl)zirconium trichloride
 (Pentamethylcyclopentadienyl)titanium trichloride
 (Indenyl)titanium trichloride

References

Metal halides
Titanocenes
Chloro complexes
Titanium(IV) compounds